John Ryder may refer to:
John Ryder (bishop) (1697–1775), Archbishop of Tuam, Ireland
John Ryder (priest) (died 1791), Irish Anglican priest
John Ryder (Canadian politician) (1805–1872), Canadian politician from Nova Scotia
John Ryder (state senator) (1831–1911), American state legislator in Ohio and Iowa
John Ryder (state representative) (1862–1940), American state legislator in Iowa
John Ryder, 5th Earl of Harrowby (1864–1956), British peer and Conservative Member of Parliament
John Ryder (actor) (1814–1885), English actor
John Ryder (scholar) (born 1951), professor and president of Khazar University in Baku, Azerbaijan
John Ryder (boxer) (born 1988), British boxer
John A. Ryder (1852–1895), American zoologist
John Ryder, villain from the 1986 film The Hitcher and its 2007 remake

See also
Jack Ryder (disambiguation)
John Rider (disambiguation)